The Red Thread is the fifth solo album by New York City singer-songwriter Lucy Kaplansky, released in 2004.

Track listing 
Unless noted otherwise, lyrics by Lucy Kaplansky & Richard Litvin, music by Lucy Kaplansky
 "I Had Something" – 4:16
 "Line in the Sand" – 4:23
 "Love Song/New York" (Bill Morrissey) – 4:35
 "This Is Home" – 4:02
 "Off and Running" (James McMurtry) – 3:44
 "Land of the Living" – 4:04
 "Cowboy Singer" (Dave Carter) – 3:59
 "Hole in My Head" (Jim Lauderdale, Buddy Miller) – 2:53
 "The Red Thread" – 3:35
 "Brooklyn Train" (Kaplansky, Litvin, Ben Wittman) – 3:15

Personnel
Lucy Kaplansky – vocals, guitar, background vocals
Duke Levine – mandolin, guitar, slide guitar, mandola, National Steel guitar, guitorgan
Andy Ezrin – piano
Jon Herington – guitar, Harmonium
Zev Katz – bass, baritone guitar
Brian Mitchell – organ
Jonatha Brooke – background vocals
Eliza Gilkyson – background vocals
John Gorka – background vocals
Richard Shindell – background vocals
Ben Wittman – piano, drums, percussion, keyboards, Wurlitzer
Production notes:
Ben Wittman – producer, engineer
Manfred Knoop – engineer
Rob Genadek – engineer
Steven Patterson – engineer
Roy Hendrickson – engineer
Ben Wisch – mixing
David Glasser – mastering
Andy Sarroff – assistant
Carla Leighton – graphic design
C. Taylor Crothers – photography
Assumpta Clohessy – make-up, hair stylist

References 

2004 albums
Lucy Kaplansky albums
Red House Records albums